Scymnus abbreviatus is a species of beetle found in the family Coccinellidae. It is found in Canada.

The beetle is less than 2mm in length with its range extending to southeastern Canada.

References 

Coccinellidae
Beetles of North America
Beetles described in 1852